Cerro Miscanti (also known as Ipira) is a mountain located in the Antofagasta Region of Chile, immediately south of Chiliques and north of Miñiques. It towers over Laguna Miscanti. Rock samples from Cerro Miscanti are of andesitic composition, but andesite-containing dacites have also been found.

A new volcano grew inside the collapse scar. Miscanti may be either extinct or may have erupted in the Pleistocene-Holocene. Renewed eruptions are likely to consist of lava flows, which could impact the northern shores of Laguna Miscanti.

An Inka sanctuary has been reported from Cerro Miscanti.

See also
 Miñiques
 Chiliques
 Laguna Miscanti
 Cordón Puntas Negras
 Los Flamencos National Reserve
 Caichinque

References

Volcanoes of Antofagasta Region
Mountains of Chile
Stratovolcanoes of Chile
Pleistocene stratovolcanoes